Dhanraj Singh (born August 26, 1947 in Georgetown, British Guiana), is a retired Guyanese bantamweight boxer, who represented his country at the 1968 Summer Olympics. There he was eliminated in his opening bout of the men's bantamweight division by Samuel Mbugua of Kenya by a 0-5 decision.

References

1947 births
Living people
Sportspeople from Georgetown, Guyana
Bantamweight boxers
Boxers at the 1968 Summer Olympics
Olympic boxers of Guyana
Guyanese male boxers 
Indo-Guyanese people